The submarines   of the Royal Navy and  of the French Navy collided in the Atlantic Ocean in the night between 3–4 February 2009. Both nuclear-powered ballistic missile submarines sustained damage, but no injuries or radioactivity releases were reported. At the time of the collision, both vessels were submerged and moving "at very low speed" according to the UK Ministry of Defence. Both are equipped with active and passive sonar, although only the latter is used on an operational patrol.

Submarines

HMS Vanguard was on a routine patrol in the Eastern Atlantic Ocean with a crew of 135. The submarine can carry a maximum load of 16 Trident II D5 ballistic missiles, with a standard patrol load of 48 warheads. Le Triomphant was returning from a tour of duty when the incident occurred; it was carrying a crew of 111, and capable of being equipped with 16 M45 ballistic missiles, with a standard patrol load of 48 warheads.

Collision
On the night between 3–4 February 2009, the two submarines collided in the Atlantic Ocean.  On 6 February 2009, the French Ministry of Defence reported that Le Triomphant "collided with an immersed object (probably a container)"  The UK Ministry of Defence initially would not comment that the incident took place.  On 16 February 2009, the incident was confirmed by First Sea Lord Sir Jonathon Band, in response to a question at an unrelated event.  Band said that the collision occurred at low speed, and that there had been no injuries.  The French Ministry of Defence also stated that a collision "at a very low speed" had occurred, with no casualties.

Both vessels were damaged. Vanguard received damage to the outer casing in the area of the missile compartment on the starboard (right) side. Le Triomphant was said to have received damage to the active sonar dome under her bow, indicating that Le Triomphant ran into Vanguard from above and amidship. Both vessels returned to home bases under their own power, Vanguard to Her Majesty's Naval Base Clyde in the Firth of Clyde on 14 February 2009, and Le Triomphant to Île Longue in Brittany, escorted by a frigate as a normal procedure.

Possible cause

Media reports have discussed two possible aspects contributing to the incident; geographic separation of the submarine operating areas (known as waterspace management), and the ability of each submarine to detect the other using acoustic methods. 

While the use of active sonar may have revealed the position of one submarine to the other, it is unlikely either boat was operating its active sonar at the time of the collision. Ballistic missile submarines are designed to conceal themselves while on patrol, and the use of active sonar would immediately reveal the boat's position. Several media outlets stated that because both submarines are equipped with modern anechoic tile coverings over their hulls and were travelling at low speed, it would have been unlikely for either submarine to have detected the presence of the other while using only their passive sonar systems.  Further, as reported by Time magazine, submarines take advantage of environmental characteristics, such as ocean currents of varying temperatures (thermoclines) or varying salinity (haloclines), to avoid detection.

The British Broadcasting Corporation has speculated that though highly improbable considering the vastness of the areas in which they operate, the actual areas used by ballistic missile submarines (SSBN) are in reality limited, and overlap. They have claimed that the use of these areas by submarines of the British, French and Russian navies has increased the risk of accidental collision.

Several media outlets have referred to comments by retired Royal Navy Commodore Stephen Saunders, editor of the Jane's Fighting Ships, where he described the incident as "very serious" and said it was time for France and Britain to coordinate their submarine operations more actively, suggesting that the use of operating areas is not communicated between operators of SSBNs; France, the UK and the United States or that communication procedures were not effective. "I would have thought it possible to at least arrange to be in different parts of the ocean without compromising operational security," said Saunders. "No doubt there are a number of technical issues to be investigated, but the root of the problem appears to be procedural."  This position appears to be corroborated by Admiral Sandy Woodward, a former commander of the Royal Navy's submarine force.  In a commentary article for The Independent newspaper, he said that whilst it is not known whether the UK and France exchange information now, it was not the case when he served as Flag Officer Submarines in 1984.  He recalls that his French counterpart proposed that London and Paris share information on SSBN patrols, precisely to avoid an incident at sea, but no agreement was reached at the time on achieving that.

Aftermath
With the delayed acknowledgement of the accident, both the British and French ministries of defence were accused of attempting a cover-up of the collision. The delay in reporting the accident was also criticised in the international press. British MP Nick Harvey demanded an official inquiry into the issue. Kate Hudson, a member of the Communist Party of Britain who was chair of the Campaign for Nuclear Disarmament at the time, said, "The collision of two submarines, both with nuclear reactors and nuclear weapons onboard could have released vast amounts of radiation and scattered scores of nuclear warheads across the seabed". A government spokesman said that there "was no compromise to nuclear safety".

Hervé Morin, France's Minister of Defence, said that they "face an extremely simple technological problem, which is that these submarines are not detectable".

See also
 Major submarine incidents since 2000
 Submarine Incident off Kildin island

References

 

2009 in international relations
2009 in France
2009 in the United Kingdom
France–United Kingdom military relations
Military history of the Atlantic Ocean
Vanguard and Le Triomphant submarine collision
Nuclear weapon safety
Nuclear weapons program of France
Trident (UK nuclear programme)
Le Triomphant and Vanguard submarine collision
Vanguard and Le Triomphant submarine collision
February 2009 events in Europe